Kimsa Warmini (Aymara kimsa three, warmi woman, -ni a suffix, "the one with the three women", also spelled Quimsa Huarmini) is a  mountain in the Bolivian Andes in a small range of that name. It is located in the La Paz Department, Nor Yungas Province, Coroico Municipality, northeast of Coroico. The range extends in a north-easterly direction.

Kimsa Warmini is also the name of the river which originates on the slopes of the mountain. It flows to the northeast.

References 

 
Mountain ranges of Bolivia